The 2014 Illinois gubernatorial election was held on November 4, 2014, to elect the Governor and Lieutenant Governor of Illinois, concurrently with the election to Illinois's Class II U.S. Senate seat, as well as other elections to the United States Senate in other states and elections to the United States House of Representatives and various state and local elections.

Prior to this cycle, candidates for Governor and Lieutenant Governor were nominated separately, and the primary winners ran on the same ticket in the general election. In 2011, the law was changed to allow candidates for Governor to pick their own running mates. Incumbent Democratic Lieutenant Governor Sheila Simon did not run for reelection, instead running unsuccessfully for comptroller. She was replaced as Quinn's running mate by Paul Vallas, a former CEO of Chicago Public Schools. Rauner chose Wheaton City Councilwoman Evelyn Sanguinetti as his running mate and Grimm chose Alex Cummings.

Incumbent Democratic Governor Pat Quinn ran for re-election to a second full term in office. Quinn, then the Lieutenant Governor, assumed the office of Governor on January 29, 2009, upon the impeachment and removal of Rod Blagojevich. He narrowly won a full term in 2010. Primary elections were held on March 18, 2014. Quinn won the Democratic primary, while the Republicans chose businessman Bruce Rauner and the Libertarians nominated political activist Chad Grimm. 

Rauner defeated Quinn in the general election with 50.3% of the vote to Quinn's 46.4%, winning every county in the state except for Cook County, home to the city of Chicago and 40% of the state's residents. Quinn was the only incumbent Democratic governor to lose a general election in 2014 and remained the last one to do so until Nevada's Steve Sisolak in 2022. 

Election information
The primaries and general elections coincided with those for federal (House and Senate) and those for other state offices. The election was part of the 2014 Illinois elections.

Turnout

For the primary election, turnout was 16.88%, with 1,267,028 votes cast. For the general election, turnout was 48.48%, with 3,627,690 votes cast.

Democratic primary

Candidates

Declared
 Tio Hardiman, former director of CeaseFire
Running mate: Brunell Donald, attorney, author and motivational speaker.
 Pat Quinn, incumbent Governor of Illinois
 Running mate: Paul Vallas, former CEO of Chicago Public Schools and candidate for governor in 2002

Withdrew
 William M. Daley, former White House Chief of Staff and former United States Secretary of Commerce

Declined
 John Atkinson, businessman
 Tom Dart, Cook County Sheriff
 Alexi Giannoulias, former Illinois Treasurer and nominee for the U.S. Senate in 2010
 David H. Hoffman, member of the Illinois Reform Commission, former Chicago Inspector General and candidate for the U.S. Senate in 2010
 Daniel Hynes, former Illinois Comptroller, candidate for the U.S. Senate in 2004 and candidate for Governor in 2010
 Lisa Madigan, Illinois Attorney General (running for re-election)
 Toni Preckwinkle, President of the Cook County Board of Commissioners
 Kwame Raoul, state senator

Endorsements

Polling

Results

Republican primary
By early summer 2013, the field seeking the Republican nomination was set at four candidates. Two of them, State Senators Bill Brady and Kirk Dillard, had sought the nomination in 2010, with Brady edging out Dillard by 193 votes, but ultimately losing to Pat Quinn by less than 1 percent. Dan Rutherford, who was elected state treasurer in 2010 after serving as a State Representative and State Senator, formally entered the race on June 2.

Rauner had announced the formation of an exploratory committee in March and made his entry into the Republican field official on June 5. Despite longstanding rumors that Rauner was committed to spending $50 million on his campaign, he denied in an interview ever specifying a dollar figure.

By the date of the primary, Rauner had broken the previous record for self-funding in an Illinois gubernatorial race by putting more than $6 million of his own money into his campaign. In total, he raised more than $14 million before the primary election.

On March 18, 2014, Rauner won the Republican primary, collecting 40% of the vote, compared to 37% for State Senator Kirk Dillard.

Candidates

Declared
 Bill Brady, State Senator, candidate for Governor in 2006 and nominee for Governor in 2010
 Running mate: Maria Rodriguez, former Village President of Long Grove
 Kirk Dillard, State Senator and candidate for Governor in 2010
 Running mate: Jil Tracy, state representative
 Bruce Rauner, businessman and former Chairman of GTCR
 Running mate: Evelyn Sanguinetti, Wheaton City Councilwoman
 Dan Rutherford, Illinois Treasurer
 Running mate: Steve Kim, Attorney and nominee for Illinois Attorney General in 2010

Removed
 Peter Edward Jones (removed from the ballot)
 Running mate: None

Declined
 Adam Andrzejewski, businessman and candidate for Governor in 2010
 Dan Duffy, state senator
 Adam Kinzinger, U.S. Representative
 Ray LaHood, former United States Secretary of Transportation and former U.S. Representative
 Matt Murphy, state senator
 Dan Proft, talk radio personality and candidate for Governor in 2010
 Christine Radogno, Minority Leader of the Illinois Senate
 Aaron Schock, U.S. Representative
 Joe Walsh, conservative radio talk show host and former U.S. Representative

Endorsements

Polling

 * Internal poll for Bill Brady campaign

Results

Third party and Independents

Candidates

Declared
 Chad Grimm (Libertarian), political activist, candidate for the State House in 2012 and candidate for the Peoria City Council in 2013
 Running mate: Alex Cummings

Removed from ballot
 Mike Oberline (Constitution)
 Running mate: Don Stone
 Scott Summers (Green)
 Running mate: Bob Pritchett, Jr.

Declined
 Sam McCann (Independent), Republican State Senator

General election

Debates
Complete video of debate, October 9, 2014 - C-SPAN
Complete video of debate, October 20, 2014 - C-SPAN

Predictions

Polling

With Quinn

With Daley

With Emanuel

With Hynes

With Madigan

 * Internal Poll for Dick Durbin campaign
 ^ Internal Poll for Pat Quinn campaign

Results

See also
2014 Illinois elections
2014 United States Senate election in Illinois
2014 United States gubernatorial elections
2014 United States elections

References

External links

Illinois gubernatorial election, 2014 at Ballotpedia
 Pat Quinn for Governor
 Bruce Rauner for Governor

Gubernatorial
2014
Illinois